Balloon is a 2019 live-action short film written and directed by Jeremy Merrifield and produced by Dream Three Films. It stars Jonah Beres and Paul Scheer and explores gender stereotypes and toxic masculinity associated with boyhood.

Balloon premiered at the Palm Springs International ShortFest. The film qualified for the Oscars by winning the Grand Prix at Hollyshorts in 2019 and was nominated for a Student Academy Award. The short film won both Best Drama Series and The Seymour Bricker Humanitarian Award at The Television Academy’s 40th annual College Television Awards.

Plot 
Junior high schooler, Sam Wheeler, wants to do nothing more than keep his head down, get through the day, and hang out with his friend Adam. All of that changes in the aftermath of a fight with Jason Kingsley as their classmates continuously share a recording of the fight online and send Sam derisive digital messages. As a consequence, Adam, too, begins to pull away. While Sam is still trying to suppress the rage, he discovers he has a latent super-ability. Backed into a corner and possessing the power to do something about it, the fate of Sam’s future hangs in the balance of his choice.

Reception 
IndieWire compared the film to Joker, saying where that film "explores the genesis of a villain," Balloon "depicts the making of a hero," while describing it as "emotionally vivid and delicately rendered" and calling it "a timely critique of the superhero mythos, offering an alternative world that prizes softness and sensitivity over brute strength." The Independent Critic called Balloon "one of the best short films of 2019."

Accolades

References 

2019 short films
Films about gender